Rhaponticum repens, synonym Acroptilon repens, with the common name Russian knapweed, is a bushy rhizomatous perennial, up to 80 cm tall. Stems and leaves are finely arachnoid-tomentose becoming glabrous and green with age. The rosette leaves are oblanceolate, pinnately lobed to entire, 2–3 cm wide by 3–8 cm long. The lower cauline leaves are smaller, pinnately lobed; the upper leaves become much reduced, sessile, serrate to entire. The heads are numerous terminating the branches. Flowers are pink to purplish, the marginal ones not enlarged. The outer and middle involucral bracts are broad, striate, smooth with broadly rounded tips; the inner bracts are narrower with hairy tips. Pappus present with bristles 6–11 mm long. Fruit is a whitish, slightly ridged achene.

Russian knapweed is a deep-rooted long-lived perennial. Some stands have been in existence for 75 years. It forms dense colonies in cultivated fields, orchards, pastures, and roadsides.

A native to Eurasia, Russian knapweed was introduced into North America in the late 19th century. Absent only from southeastern U.S., it has become widespread in other regions, especially in the western United States.

Nigropallidal encephalomalacia also called Chewing disease, a movement disorder similar to Parkinson's disease,  is caused in horses ingesting Russian knapweed for prolonged periods. A sesquiterpene lactone, Repin, in the plant is likely responsible for this toxicity.

Taxonomy
The species was first described by Carl Linnaeus in 1763 as Centaurea repens. Augustin Pyramus de Candolle separated it from the genus Centaurea in 1838, placing it in the genus Acroptilon. The genus name derives from acro- (high, here meaning tip) and ptilo- (feather). A 1995 molecular phylogenetic study, the structure of the flower, and the chromosome number support separating it from the genus Centaurea. Some sources then continue to place it as the sole member of the monotypic genus Acroptilon. A phylogenetic study published in 2006 concluded that Acroptilon belongs in the genus Rhaponticum, a placement recognized by The Plant List where this species is called Rhaponticum repens.

References

External links
Jepson Manual Treatment
Photo gallery
Species Profile- Russian Knapweed (Rhaponticum repens), National Invasive Species Information Center, United States National Agricultural Library. Lists general information and resources for Russian Knapweed.

Cynareae
Flora of Asia
Flora of Europe
Plants described in 1763